Quchayuq (Quechua qucha lake, -yuq a suffix, "the one with a lake (or lakes)", also spelled Cuchayoc) is a mountain in Peru which reaches a height of approximately  . It is located in the Junín Region, Yauli Province, Morococha District. Quchayuq lies northeast of a mountain and a lake named Yuraqqucha (Quechua for "white lake").

References

Mountains of Peru
Mountains of Junín Region